Black conservatism in the United States is a political and social movement rooted in communities of African descent that aligns largely with the American conservative movement, including the Christian right. Black conservatism emphasizes  social conservatism, traditionalism, patriotism, capitalism, and free markets. What characterizes a "black conservative" has changed over time, and the people listed below do not necessarily share the same political philosophy. 

Influential Black conservatives in the early 21st century who held office include Senator Tim Scott, Supreme Court Justice Clarence Thomas, and Cabinet secretaries Ben Carson, Condoleezza Rice, and Colin Powell. Thomas Sowell, Shelby Steele, Armstrong Williams, Walter Williams and Candace Owens are among the most influential black conservative political commentators.

Overview

Beliefs 

One of the main characteristics of black conservatism is its emphasis on personal choice and responsibilities above socioeconomic status and institutional racism. In the tradition of African American politics and intellectual life, black conservatives tend to side with Booker T. Washington as contrasted with W. E. B. Du Bois. For many black conservatives, the key mission is to bring repair and success to the black community by applying the following fundamental principles:
 The pursuit of educational and professional excellence as a means of advancement within the society;
 Policies that promote safety and security in the community beyond the typical casting of a criminal as a "victim" of societal racism;
 Not using the lens of race and the country's history of discrimination as justifications for not excelling to the best of your abilities;
 Local economic development through free enterprise rather than looking to the federal government for assistance;
 Empowerment of the individual via self-improvement (virtue), conscience, and supernatural grace.

Black conservatives typically oppose affirmative action and tend to argue that efforts to obtain reparations for slavery are either misguided or counter-productive. Black conservatives tend to be self-critical of aspects of African-American culture that they believe have created poverty and dependency. 

Black conservatives—especially black Republicans—are often accused of being Uncle Toms. Ebony in their May  2001 "100+ Most Influential Black Americans" issue, did not include a number of influential African Americans such as Thomas Sowell, Shelby Steele, Armstrong Williams, Walter Williams and, most notably, Supreme Court Justice Clarence Thomas. The Economist described the exclusion of Justice Thomas from the list as spiteful. 

Black conservatives favor integration of African Americans into mainstream America and, consequently, disagree with black nationalism and separatism. Black conservatives are more inclined to support economic policies promoting free trade and tax cuts.

According to a 2004 study , 14% of blacks identified as "Conservative" or "Extremely Conservative"with another 14% identifying as slightly conservative. However, the same study indicated that less than ten percent identified as Republican or Republican-leaning.  Likewise, a 2007 Pew Research Center survey showed that 19% of blacks identified as Religious Right. In 2004, though, the Pew Research Center indicated only 7% of blacks identified as Republican.

A National Election Pool poll showed that support for California Proposition 8 (2008) (a state constitutional amendment defining marriage as an opposite-sex union) was strong among African-American voters; 70% of those interviewed in the exit poll—a higher percentage than any other racial group—stated that they voted in favor of Proposition 8. Polls by both the Associated Press and CNN mirrored this data, reporting support among black voters to be at 70% and 75%, respectively. African American support was considered crucial to the Proposition's passage because African Americans made up an unusually large percentage of voters in 2008; the presence of African American presidential candidate Barack Obama on the ballot was believed to have increased African American voter turnout.

Historical basis 

From Reconstruction up until the New Deal, the black population tended to vote Republican. During that period, the Republican Party—particularly in the Southern United States—was seen as more racially liberal than the Democratic Party, primarily because of the role of the Southern wing of the Democratic Party as the party of racial segregation and the Republican Party's roots in the abolitionist movement (see Dixiecrats).

Blacks started to shift in significant numbers to the Democrats with the election of Franklin D. Roosevelt and continued with the election of John F. Kennedy. Among Truman Administration officials, the publication of Henry Lee Moon's Balance of Power spurred Democratic partisan support for African-American constituencies. This shift was also influenced by Herbert Hoover's practice of firing loyal African-Americans from positions within the Republican Party, in order to increase his appeal to Southern white voters. This can be considered an early example of a set of Republican Party methods that were later termed the Southern Strategy.

Timeline of events

This is a timeline of significant events in African-American history that have shaped the conservative movement in the United States.

 1950s
 1954 – President Dwight Eisenhower appoints the following:
 Archie Alexander as Governor of the U.S. Virgin Islands
 J. Ernest Wilkins Sr. as Undersecretary of Labor for International Labor Affairs
 E. Frederic Morrow as Administrative Officer for Special Projects
 1960s
 Melvin H. Evans is elected Governor of the U.S. Virgin Islands
 1970s
 1975 – President Gerald Ford appoints the following:
 William T. Coleman as Secretary of Transportation
 James B. Parsons is named Chief Judge of the US District Court in Chicago
 1978 – Melvin H. Evans is elected to US Congress (Virgin Islands)
 1979 – Ethel D. Allen is appointed Secretary of the Commonwealth of Pennsylvania 
 1980s
 1980 – NAACP President Benjamin Hooks is invited to address the Republican National Convention
 1981 – President Ronald Reagan appoints the following:
 Clarence M. Pendleton Jr. as Chairman of the US Civil Rights Commission
 Samuel Pierce as United States Secretary of Housing and Urban Development
 1982 – President Reagan appoints Clarence Thomas as Chairman of the Equal Employment Opportunity Commission.
 1985 – President Reagan appoints Alan Keyes the Assistant Secretary of State for International Organization Affairs.
 1987 – President Reagan appoints Colin L. Powell the National Security Advisor.
 1989 – President George H. W. Bush appoints the following:
 Louis Wade Sullivan as United States Secretary of Health and Human Services
 General Colin L. Powell as Chairman of the Joint Chiefs of Staff
 Condoleezza Rice as Senior Director of the National Security Council for Soviet and East European Affairs
 Constance Berry Newman as Director of United States Office of Personnel Management
 Vernon Parker as Special Assistant to the President on the White House Staff
 1990s
 1990 – Arthur Fletcher is appointed as the Chairman of the United States Commission on Civil Rights
 1990 – President George H. W. Bush appoints George W. Haley chairman of the Postal Rate Commission
 1990 – Gary Franks (CT) is elected to US Congress
 1991 – President George H. W. Bush appoints Clarence Thomas to U.S. Supreme Court
 1993 – President George H. W. Bush appoints John W. Shannon as United States Under Secretary of the Army
 1994 – Victoria Buckley elected as Secretary of State of Colorado
 Lonna Hooks appointed as Secretary of State of New Jersey
 1994 – J. C. Watts (OK) elected to US Congress
 1998 – U.S. House of Representatives elects J. C. Watts (R-OK) to be Chairman of the House Republican Conference.
 DeForest Soaries appointed as Secretary of State of New Jersey
 1998 – Ken Blackwell elected as the Ohio Secretary of State
 Joe Rogers elected as the Lieutenant Governor of Colorado
 2000s
 2001 – President George W. Bush appoints the following:
 General Colin Powell as the United States Secretary of State
 Roderick R. Paige as the United States Secretary of Education
 Condoleezza Rice as Advisor of the National Security Council
 Alphonso Jackson as the Deputy Secretary of Housing and Urban Development
 Claude Allen as the Deputy Secretary of Health and Human Services
 Leo S. Mackay Jr. as the Deputy Secretary of Veterans Affairs
 Larry D. Thompson as the United States Deputy Attorney General
 Michael Powell as the Chairman of the Federal Communications Commission
 Stephen A. Perry as Administrator of General Services Administration
 Kay Coles James as Director of United States Office of Personnel Management
 Charles E. James, Sr. as Director of Federal Contract Compliance
 Ruth A. Davis as Director General of the Foreign Service
 Reginald J. Brown as Assistant Secretary of the Army (Manpower and Reserve Affairs)
 Brigadier General Francis X. Taylor as Coordinator for Counterterrorism
 Eric M. Bost as Under Secretary of Agriculture for Food, Nutrition, and Consumer Services
 Brian C. Roseboro as Assistant Secretary of the Treasury for Financial Markets
 Dr. Eric Motley as Deputy Associate Director, Office of Presidential Personnel
 Pierre-Richard Prosper as United States Ambassador-at-Large for War Crimes Issues
 Andrea Barthwell as deputy director for Demand Reduction at the Office of National Drug Control Policy
 Randy Daniels, Secretary of State of New York joins the GOP.
 2002 – President George W. Bush appoints the following:
 Major General Claude M. Bolton Jr. as United States Assistant Secretary of the Army for Acquisition, Logistics, and Technology
 Lynn Swann as Chairman of the President's Council on Physical Fitness and Sports
 Brigadier General Francis X. Taylor as Assistant Secretary of State for Diplomatic Security
 Ron Christie as Special Assistant to the President
 Michael Steele elected as Lieutenant Governor of Maryland
 Jennette Bradley elected as Lieutenant Governor of Ohio
 2003 – President George W. Bush appoints the following:
 Clark Ervin as Inspector General of the United States Department of Homeland Security
 Vernon Parker as Assistant Secretary of Agriculture for Civil Rights
 2004 – President George W. Bush appoints the following:
 Alphonso Jackson as United States Secretary of Housing and Urban Development
 Gerald A. Reynolds as Chairman of the United States Commission on Civil Rights
 Constance Berry Newman as Assistant Secretary of State for African Affairs
 Brian C. Roseboro as Under Secretary of the Treasury for Domestic Finance
 Randy Brock elected as Vermont Auditor of Accounts
 2005 – President George W. Bush appoints the following:
 Condoleezza Rice as United States Secretary of State
 Claude Allen as Director of the Domestic Policy Council
 Admiral John O. Agwunobi as United States Assistant Secretary for Health
 Jendayi Frazer as Assistant Secretary of State for African Affairs
 B. J. Penn as Assistant Secretary of the Navy (Installation and Environment)
 Jennette Bradley is appointed Ohio State Treasurer
 2006 – President George W. Bush appoints the following:
 Lurita Doan as Administrator of the U.S. General Services Administration
 Ronald J. James as Assistant Secretary of the Army (Manpower and Reserve Affairs)
 Naomi C. Earp as Chair of the Equal Employment Opportunity Commission
 2009 – Michael Steele elected Chairman of the Republican National Committee
 2010s
 2010 – Tim Scott (SC) and Lt Col. Allen West (FL) elected to US Congress
 Jennifer Carroll is elected Lieutenant Governor of Florida
 2011 – Herman Cain sought the Republican presidential nomination in 2012
 2012 – Artur Davis, a former Democratic Party member of the United States House of Representatives joins the GOP.
 2013 – Tim Scott (SC) is appointed to the US Senate.
 Dwayne Sawyer is appointed as Indiana State Auditor
 2014 – Mia Love (UT) and Will Hurd (TX) elected to US Congress
 Boyd Rutherford is elected Lieutenant Governor of Maryland
 2015 – Ben Carson sought the Republican presidential nomination in 2016
 Jenean Hampton is elected Lieutenant Governor of Kentucky
 2016 – Curtis Hill is elected Indiana Attorney General
 Colin Powell receives three electoral votes for president from faithless electors
 2017 – President Donald Trump appoints the following: 
 Ben Carson as United States Secretary of Housing and Urban Development
 Omarosa Manigault as Director of Communications for the Office of Public Liaison
 Jerome Adams as Surgeon General of the United States
 Naomi C. Earp as Agriculture Assistant Secretary for Civil Rights
 Alveda King as a member of the Frederick Douglass Bicentennial Commission
 Johnny C. Taylor Jr. as Chairman of the President's Board of Advisors on Historically Black Colleges and Universities
 Ja'Ron Smith as Director of Urban Affairs and Revitalization
 Charles E. James, Sr as Director of the Transport Department Office of Civil Rights
 Cyril Sartor as Director for African Affairs
 James E. Williams as Chief Financial Officer of Labor
 Brigadier General L. Eric Patterson as Director of Homeland Security's Federal Protective Service
 Jacquelyn Hayes-Byrd as Assistant Secretary of Veterans Affairs for Human Resources and Administration
 Dana W. White as Assistant to the Secretary of Defense for Public Affairs
 Andrew F. Knaggs as Deputy Assistant Secretary of Defense for Special Operations and Combating Terrorism
 Gary Washington as Member of the Board of Directors of the Commodity Credit Corporation
 2018 – President Donald Trump appoints the following:
 Kiron Skinner as Director of Policy Planning 
 Robyn Crittenden appointed Secretary of State of Georgia
 2019 – President Donald Trump appoints the following: 
 Tamara Bonzanto as Assistant Secretary of Veterans Affairs (Accountability and Whistleblower Protection)
 Hannibal Ware as Inspector General of the Small Business Administration 
 Michael Kubayanda as Commissioner of the Postal Regulatory Commission
 Rodney Hood as a Member of the National Credit Union Administration
 Daniel Cameron elected Kentucky Attorney General
2020s
 2020 – Burgess Owens (UT) and Byron Donalds (FL) elected to US Congress
 2021 – Winsome Sears is elected Lieutenant Governor of Virginia
 2022 – Wesley Hunt (TX) and John James (MI) elected to US Congress

African American Conservative politicians

Alabama
 Kenneth Paschal – Alabama State Representative (2021–present)
 Juan Chastang – Mobile County Commissioner (2005–2008)

Alaska
 Stanley Wright - Alaska State Assemblyman (2023-present)
 Sharon Jackson – Alaska State Assemblywoman (2018–2021)
 David S. Wilson – Alaska State Senator (2017–present)
 Walt Furnace – Alaska State Assemblyman (1983–1991)
 Selwyn Carrol – Alaska State Assemblyman (1973–1975)

Arizona
 David Marshall – Arizona State Representative (2023-present)
 Jerone Davison – U.S. House candidate (2022) and Oakland Raiders football player
 Walter Blackman – Arizona State Representative (2019–2023) and U.S. House candidate (2022)

California
Larry Elder – Governor of California nominee (2021)
 Rosey Grier – Governor of California candidate (2018) and New York Giants football player.
 Damon Dunn – California Secretary of State nominee (2010) and Dallas Cowboys football player
 H. Abram Wilson – Mayor of San Ramon, California (2002–2007)
 Ward Connerly – University of California Regent (1993–2005)

Connecticut
 George Logan – U.S. House nominee (2022) and Connecticut State Senator (2017–2021)
 Aundre Bumgardner – Connecticut State Representative (2015–2017)

Delaware
 Donald Blakey – Delaware State Representative (2007–2015)

Florida
 Corey Simon – Florida State Senator (2022-present) and Indianapolis Colts football player.
 Berny Jacques - Florida State Representative (2022-present)
 Kiyan Michael - Florida State Representative (2022-present)
 Webster Barnaby – Florida State Representative (2021–present)
 Mike Hill – Florida State Representative (2019–2021 & 2013–2017)
 Peter Boulware – Florida House of Representatives nominee (2008) and Baltimore Ravens football player

Georgia
 Herschel Walker – U.S. Senate nominee (2022) and Dallas Cowboys football player
 Melvin Everson – Georgia State Representative (2005–2011)
 Willie Talton – Georgia State Representative (2005–2015)
 Vernon Jones – Georgia State Representative (1993–2001 and 2017–2021); previously a Democrat, he switched to Republican in January 2021

Hawaii
 Kenji Price - United States Attorney for the District of Hawaii (2018-2021)

Illinois
 Richard Irvin – Mayor of Aurora (2017–present)
 Erika Harold – Illinois Attorney General nominee (2018), U.S. House candidate (2012/2014) and Miss America (2003)
 John D. Anthony – Illinois State Representative (2013–2016)

Indiana
 Roger Brown – Indianapolis City Councillor (1993-1997) and Indiana Pacers basketball player

Iowa
 Eddie Andrews – Iowa State Representative (2021–present)

Kansas
Patrick Penn – Kansas State Representative (2021-present)
Tony Barton – Kansas State Representative (2015–2017)
Willie Dove – Kansas State Representative (2013–2021)
George W. Haley  – Kansas State Senator (1964–1968)

Kentucky
 Donald Douglas – Kentucky State Senator (2021–present)

Louisiana
 Elbert Guillory – Louisiana State Senator (2009–2015) and Lieutenant Governor of Louisiana candidate (2015)

Maryland
 Brenda J. Thiam – Maryland State Delegate (2020–present)
 Kimberly Klacik – U.S. House nominee (2020)
 Aris T. Allen – Maryland State Delegate (1991 & 1967–1974), Lieutenant Governor nominee (1978) and State Senator (1979–1982)

Massachusetts
 Frank Cousins – Massachusetts State Representative (1993–1996) and Essex County Sheriff (1996–2018)
 Althea Garrison – Massachusetts State Representative (1993–1995)

Michigan
 James Craig – Chief of the Detroit Police Department (2013-2021) and Gubernatorial candidate (2022)
 Paul H. Scott – Michigan State Representative (2009–2011)
 Larry DeShazor – Michigan State Representative (2009–2011)
 Bill Hardiman – Michigan State Senator (2003–2011), Mayor of Kentwood, Michigan (1992–2002) and U.S. House candidate (2010)
 Keith Butler – Detroit Councilman (1989–1993) and U.S. Senate candidate (2006)
 William Lucas – Wayne County Sheriff (1969–1982) and Governor of Michigan nominee (1986)

Minnesota
 Lisa Demuth – Minnesota State Representative (2019–present)
 Walter Hudson – Minnesota State Representative (2023–present)
 Ray Pleasant – Minnesota State Representative (1973–1981)

Mississippi
 Angela McGlowan – Miss District of Columbia USA (1994) and U.S. House candidate (2010)
 Nic Lott – chairman for the Mississippi Young Republicans
 Yvonne Brown – Mayor of Tchula, Mississippi (2001–2009) and U.S. House nominee (2006)
 Charles Evers – Mayor of Fayette, Mississippi (1969–1981 & 1985–1989)

Missouri
 Shamed Dogan – Missouri State Representative (2015–2023)
 Neal E. Boyd – 2008 Winner of America's Got Talent and nominee/candidate for the Missouri House of Representatives (2012/2014)
 Sherman Parker – Missouri State Representative (2002–2008)
 Carson Ross – Missouri State Representative (1989–2002) and Mayor of Blue Springs, Missouri (2008–present)

Nebraska
 Dinah Abrahamson – Nebraska State Central Committeewoman (2005–2013)

Nevada
 Niger Innis – Director of Congress of Racial Equality (CORE) and U.S. House candidate (2014)
 Maurice Washington – Nevada State Senator (1994–2010)
 Lynette Boggs – Miss Oregon (1989), Las Vegas City Council (1999–2004), Clark County Commission (2004–2006) and U.S. House nominee (2002)

New Hampshire
 Jim Lawrence – New Hampshire State Representative (2004–2010) and U.S. House nominee (2016)

New Jersey
 Antwan McClellan – New Jersey State Assemblyman (2020–present)
 Garry Cobb – U.S. House nominee (2014) and Dallas Cowboys football player 
 Bruce Harris – Mayor of Chatham Borough, New Jersey (2012–2019) and member of the New Jersey State Planning Commission (2020–present)
 Martin G. Barnes – Mayor of Paterson, New Jersey (1997–2002)
 Thomas S. Smith – New Jersey State Assemblyman (1992–2002)
 Jim Usry – Mayor of Atlantic City, New Jersey (1984–1990)
 Matthew G. Carter  – Mayor of Montclair, New Jersey (1968–1972)

New Mexico
 Conrad James – New Mexico State Representative (2010–2012 & 2014–2016)
 Jane Powdrell-Culbert – New Mexico State Representative (2002–2022)

New York
Keith Wofford – Attorney General of New York nominee (2018)
 Michel Faulkner – U.S. House nominee (2010) and New York Jets football player
 Roy Innis – Chairman of the Congress of Racial Equality (CORE) & a member of the National Rifle Association's governing board.
 Richard E. Jackson  – Commissioner of Motor Vehicles (1995–2000)
 Joseph Holland – New York State Commissioner of Communities and Urban Renewal (1995-1997)
 James Garner – Mayor of Hempstead (1988–2005) and U.S. House nominee (2004)
 Joe Pinion - Unsuccessfully ran against Chuck Schumer in the 2022 US Senate Election
 Myrtle Whitmore

North Carolina
 Ken Fontenot - North Carolina State Representative (2023-present)
 Thomas Stith III – Governor of North Carolina Pat McCrory's Chief of Staff (2013–2016)
 Dr. Ada Fisher – NC Republican National Committeewoman (2008–present) and U.S. House nominee (2006 & 2008)

Ohio
 Josh Williams - Ohio State Representative (2023-present)
 Michele Reynolds - Ohio State Senator (2023-present)
 Janet C. Howard - Ohio State Senator (1995-1998)
 Robert C. Henry– Mayor of Springfield, Ohio (1966–1968)

Oklahoma
 T. W. Shannon – Oklahoma State Representative (2007–2015) and Speaker of the Oklahoma House of Representatives (2013–2014)

Oregon
 Jackie Winters – Oregon State Senator (2002–2019)

Pennsylvania
 Harry Lewis Jr. – Pennsylvania State Representative (2014–2018)
 Lynn Swann – Governor of Pennsylvania Nominee (2006) and Pittsburgh Steelers football player
 Renee Amoore – Pennsylvania's Republican State Committeewoman (1992–2000)

South Carolina
 Mike Reichenbach - South Carolina State Senator (2022-present)
 Samuel Rivers Jr. – South Carolina State Representative (2012–2018)

South Dakota
 Tony Randolph – South Dakota State Representative (2018–present)

Texas
 Charles Cunningham – Texas State Representative (2023–present)
 Scott Turner – Texas State Representative (2013–2017) and Denver Broncos football player
 Stefani Carter – Texas State Representative (2011–2015)
 James White – Texas State Representative (2011–2023)
 Michael L. Williams – Commissioner of the Texas Education Agency (2012–2015), Chairman of the Texas Railroad Commission (1999–2011) and U.S. House candidate (2012)
 Robin Armstrong – Vice Chairman of the Republican Party of Texas (2006–2010)
 Clay Smothers – Texas State Representative (1977–1981)

Utah
 Alvin B. Jackson – Utah State Senator (2013–2016)
 James Evans – Utah State Senator (2002–2004) and Chairman of the Utah Republican Party (2013–2017)

Vermont
 Randy Brock - Vermont State Senator (2009-2013, 2017-present), Minority Leader of the Vermont Senate (2021-present), and Vermont Auditor of Accounts (2005-2007)

Virginia
 A.C Cordoza - Virginia State Delegate (2022-present)
 E. W. Jackson – Lieutenant Governor of Virginia Nominee (2013)
 Paul Clinton Harris – Virginia State Delegate (1998–2002)
 Noel C. Taylor – Mayor of Roanoke, Virginia (1975–1992)
 Winsome Sears – Lieutenant Governor of Virginia (2022–present) and Virginia State Delegate (2002-2004)

Washington
 Michael Ross  – Washington State Representative (1971–1973)
 Charles Stokes – Washington State Representative (1951–1959)

West Virginia
 Caleb Hanna – West Virginia State Delegate (2018–present)
 Jill Upson – West Virginia State Delegate (2014–2018)

Wisconsin
 Julian Bradley – Wisconsin State Senate (2021–present)

Wyoming
 Lynn Hutchings – Wyoming State Representative (2012–2014) & Wyoming State Senator (2018–present)

Other people

United States judges 
 Angela Tucker – Texas District Court Judge (2012–present)
 Ada E. Brown – United States District Judge of the United States District Court for the Northern District of Texas.
 Clarence Thomas – Associate Justice of the Supreme Court of the United States (1991–present)
 Dale Wainwright – Associate Justice of the Texas Supreme Court (2003–2012)
 David W. Williams – Judge of the United States District Court for the Central District of California (1969–2000)
 George C. Hanks Jr. – Justice on the Texas state First Court of Appeals (2010–2015) & Judge of the United States District Court for the Southern District of Texas (2015–present)
 Janice Rogers Brown – Associate Justice of the Supreme Court of California (1996–2005) & U.S. Court of Appeals for the District of Columbia Circuit (2005–2017)
 Jerome Holmes – United States Circuit Judge of the United States Court of Appeals for the Tenth Circuit
 Kevin A. Ross – Judge of the Los Angeles County Superior Court (1996–2005) & Judge on America's Court with Judge Ross (2010–present)
 Kurtis T. Wilder – Justice of the Michigan Supreme Court (2017–2018)
 Lynn Toler – Arbitrator on the court series Divorce Court (2001–present)
 Robert P. Young Jr. – Justice of the Michigan Supreme Court (1999–2017) & Chief Justice of the Michigan Supreme Court (2011–2017)
 Sara J. Harper – Ohio Court of Appeals (1990–2003)
 Wallace Jefferson – Associate Justice of the Texas Supreme Court (2001–2004) & Chief Justice of the Texas Supreme Court (2004–2013)
 Barrington D. Parker – United States District Judge, United States District Court for the District of Columbia (1969–1985)

Ambassadors 
 Alan Keyes
 Edward J. Perkins – United States Ambassador to the United Nations (1992–1993)
 Eric M. Bost – United States Ambassador to South Africa (2006–2009)

TV personalities, authors and journalists 
 Amy Holmes – News anchor and political contributor on CNN
 Armond White – Film critic for National Review and Out Magazine
 Armstrong Williams – Author of Beyond Blame and TV host of On Point
 Brandon Tatum – Former police officer, commentator and professional speaker.
 Candace Owens – Writer and commentator
 Carol M. Swain – television personality and professor of political science and law at Vanderbilt University
 Charles Payne – Fox News and Fox Business journalist
 CJ Pearson – Journalist 
 C.L. Bryant – TV host
 Deneen Borelli – Author, columnist, and Fox News contributor
 Diamond and Silk (Lynnette Hardaway and Rochelle Richardson) – Live-stream video bloggers, political activists and Newsmax TV hosts
 George Schuyler – Journalist
 Philippa Schuyler – Pianist, author, journalist
 Hallie Quinn Brown – Author
 Harris Faulkner – Television host for Fox News 
 James Golden – Producer for The Rush Limbaugh Show (under the alias "Bo Snerdley")
 Reverend Jesse Lee Peterson – President of the Brotherhood Organization of a New Destiny
 Jason Riley – Journalist
 Katrina Pierson – Tea Party activist, communications consultant and a regular CNN contributor
 Larry Elder – Author of 10 Things You Can't Say in America and radio host
 Lawrence B. Jones – Radio host, contributor to Fox News, and author
 Lenny McAllister – Author of Diary of a Mad Black PYC (Proud Young Conservative) and radio talk-show host from WVON-AM Chicago
 Lester Holt – News anchor at NBC News, a registered Republican since 2003
 Michael King – Emmy Award-winning television producer
 Michelle Bernard – Journalist
 Nannie Helen Burroughs – Author
 Paris Dennard – Commentator on CNN and NPR, and the Senior Director of Strategic Communications for the Thurgood Marshall College Fund
 Raynard Jackson – Columnist and TV political analyst
 Shelby Steele – Author
 Samantha Marika – Political commentator
 Tommy Sotomayor – Radio and internet talk show host, YouTube personality, men's rights activist and film producer
 Tony Brown – Journalist and host of Tony Brown's Journal
 Zora Neale Hurston - Author, anthropologist and filmmaker
 Ben Kinchlow – Evangelist, television and radio personality
 Jason Whitlock – Sports Journalist, radio personality, commentator and writer.
 Lawrence Dennis – Mixed-race, diplomat, consultant, author
 Leo Terrell – civil rights attorney, talk radio host
 Tyrus (wrestler) – Professional wrestler, actor and Fox News commentator

Military 
 Lieutenant Colonel Frances Rice – Chairwoman of the National Black Republican Association
 Major General Mary J. Kight – Adjutant General of California (2010–2011)
 Lieutenant General Russel L. Honoré
 Percy A. Pierre – served as acting Secretary of the United States Army in January 1981.
 General Colin Powell – former U.S. Secretary of State, former chairman, Joint Chiefs of Staff, former National Security Adviser, changed political party affiliation from Republican to Independent in 2021.

Columnists 
 Deroy Murdock – National Review columnist
 Ken Hamblin – Denver Post columnist
 Robert A. George – Columnist for the New York Post
 Stephen L. Carter – Christianity Today columnist, author of The Culture of Disbelief
 Sophia A. Nelson – Chair of PoliticalIntersection.com and politicalintersection.blogspot.com
 Star Parker – President of the Coalition on Urban Renewal and Education, columnist & author

Athletes and entertainers
 Bryan Clay – Washington Times
 David Tyree – NFL Football player
 Don King – Boxing promoter
 Ernie Banks – MLB baseball player
 Greg Anthony –  NBA Basketball player
 Herschel Walker – NFL Football player
 Kevin and Keith Hodge – Prominent YouTube commentators, comedians, and trainers. 
 James Brown – Musician. Openly endorsed Richard Nixon at the 1972 presidential election and named Strom Thurmond as one of his heroes during a 1999 interview with Rolling Stone.
 Jimmie Walker – Actor
 Johnny Mathis – Singer
 Joseph C. Phillips – Actor
 Joy Villa – Singer. Promoted and supported Donald Trump's presidency in 2017.
 Kanye West – Rapper and record producer. Endorsed Donald Trump subsequently to the 2016 presidential election. Met President Trump in the Oval Office on 11 October 2018. Independent candidate for President of the United States in 2020 and 2024.
 Karl Malone – Olympic Gold medallist and basketball player
 Mike Jones – WWF wrestler
 Nolan Carroll – NFL Football player and son of Jennifer Carroll, Lieutenant Governor of Florida
 Pearl Bailey – Actress and singer
 Ronnie Lott – NFL Football player
 Stacey Dash – Actress
 Thurman Thomas – NFL Football player
 Tony Dungy – NFL Football player and coach
 Wilt Chamberlain – NBA Basketball player
 Isaiah Washington – Actor
 Rosey Grier - Former football player, actor, singer, Protestant minister, he addressed the 1984 Republican National Convention and endorsed Ronald Reagan for reelection.

Education and business
 Alveda King – Niece of Dr. Martin Luther King Jr. and senior fellow at the Alexis de Tocqueville Institution
 Arthur Fletcher – Academic
 Booker T. Washington – Educator, author, orator, and adviser to several presidents of the United States
 Chris Darden – Attorney
 George Washington Carver – Agricultural scientist and inventor who promoted alternative crops to cotton and methods to prevent soil depletion
 Glenn Loury – Academic, economist, and podcast host
 Herman Cain – Former CEO of Godfather's Pizza, talk show host, and one-time presidential candidate
 Jessie De Priest – Music teacher, wife of Congressman Oscar Stanton De Priest. Her presence at a White House tea given by Lou Henry Hoover on June 12, 1929, caused a scandal
 Joshua I. Smith – Businessman
 Marvin Scott – Academic
 Michael Powell - Former Republican member of the Federal Communications Commission, current president National Cable and Telecommunications Association.
 Dr. Mildred Fay Jefferson – First African American to graduate from Harvard Medical School
 Samuel B. Fuller – Businessman
 Stephen N. Lackey – Businessman
 Thomas Sowell – American economist, social theorist, and senior fellow at Stanford University's Hoover Institution.
 Vern S. Williams – Member of the National Mathematics Advisory Panel
 Walter Edward Williams – American economist, commentator, and academic

Civil rights, abolitionists and activists
 Eldridge Cleaver – Leader of the Black Panther Party who later became a Republican
 James Meredith – Civil rights campaigner, who served as domestic adviser to Jesse Helms
 James Weldon Johnson – Activist, served as treasurer of Colored Republican Club
 Scipio Africanus Jones – Activist
 Dr. T. R. M. Howard – Founder of Regional Council of Negro Leadership, surgeon, supporter of right to abortion, ally of Dwight Eisenhower
 Bayard Rustin – Civil rights activist who became neoconservative in later life
 Michael the Black Man – Maurice Woodside, activist
 James David Manning – Pastor, ATLAH World Missionary Church, activist
 Bishop Eddie Long – Pastor, New Birth Missionary Baptist Church, activist
 Enrique Tarrio – Henry "Enrique" Tarrio, identifies as Afro-Cuban, activist
 Manning Johnson – Former Communist who became an anti-communist activist
 Darrell C. Scott – Pastor, activist
 Ali Alexander – Social media personality and activist, of African-American and Arab ancestry
 Archibald Grimke – Civil rights activist
 Ezola Foster – Teacher, writer, political activist, and unsuccessful candidate for public office on the Republican and Reform Party tickets
 Roscoe Simmons – Orator, journalist, political activist, he was part of the "Old Guard" of Black Republicans in Tennessee.  He attended three Republican National Conventions and seconded the nomination of Herbert Hoover in 1932.

Organizations 
 Congress of Racial Equality
 American Civil Rights Institute
 Project 21
 Coalition on Urban Renewal and Education
 National Black Republican Association
 Blexit
 Lincoln League

See also

 Conservative Democrat
 Hip Hop Republican
 African Americans in the United States Congress
 List of minority governors and lieutenant governors in the United States
 Hispanic and Latino Conservatism in the United States
 The Colored Patriots of the American Revolution
 Asian American and Pacific Islands American conservatism in the United States
 Black Lies, White Lies
 List of African-American Republicans
 Black-owned businesses

References

Further reading

 Blain, Charles J., Black Churches Can't Stand Strong If They Keep Democrats as Their Platform (2017)
 Conti, Joseph G & Brad Stetson, Challenging the Civil Rights Establishment: Profiles of a New Black Vanguard (1993)
 Eisenstadt, Peter, ed. Black Conservatism: Essays in Intellectual and Political History (1999)
 Farina, Stan, Brad Stetson & Joseph G. Conti, eds. Black and Right:   The bold new voice of Black conservatives in America (1997)
 Lewis, Angela K., "Black conservatism in America," Journal of African American Studies, Vol 8, Issue 4, pp. 3–13 (2005)
 Ondaatje, Michael, Black Conservative Intellectuals in Modern America (2010)

External links
 Murray, Mark. "GOP diversity aims at a crucial Democratic bloc." NBC News. April 25, 2006.
 "The New Black Republicans." WBUR, Boston's NPR. June 2, 2004.
Organizations
 Alliance of Black Republicans
 African American Republican Leadership Council
 Black Conservative Think Tank
 Black America's PAC
 Congress of Racial Equality
 American Civil Rights Institute
 New Coalition for Economic and Social Change
 National Black Republican Association

 
Conservatism in the United States